is a Japanese professional footballer who plays as a goalkeeper for J2 League club V-Varen Nagasaki, on loan from FC Tokyo.

Club career
Hatano joined FC Tokyo in 2016. On May 29, he debuted in the J3 League (v AC Nagano Parceiro).

In December 2022, it was announced that Hatano would be joining J2 League club V-Varen Nagasaki on loan for the 2023 season.

National team career
In May 2017, Hatano was called-up to the Japan U-20 national team for the 2017 U-20 World Cup. However, he did not play in any of the matches, as he was used as the reserve goalkeeper.

Club statistics
.

Honours

Club
FC Tokyo
J.League Cup : 2020

References

External links

Profile at FC Tokyo

1998 births
Living people
People from Musashimurayama, Tokyo
Association football people from Tokyo Metropolis
Japanese footballers
Japan youth international footballers
J1 League players
J2 League players
J3 League players
FC Tokyo players
FC Tokyo U-23 players
V-Varen Nagasaki players
Association football goalkeepers